Sir Miles Rawstron Walker  (born 13 November 1940) is a Manx businessman and politician, who was the first ever Chief Minister of the Isle of Man.

Early life and career

Born on 13 November 1940 to George Denis Walker and Alice (née Whittaker), he was educated at Castle Rushen High School and the Shropshire Agricultural College. He later went on to become a company director in the farming and retail dairy trade. He was an Arbory commissioner (a local government role) from 1970 until 1976, latterly as the chairman. In 1976 he was elected as an MHK for Rushen. He remained an MHK until he retired at the 2001 General Election. In 1986 he was elected as the island's first ever Chief Minister, and continued in the post until the 1996 election.  He was honoured as Commander of the Order of the British Empire (CBE) in 1991. He was awarded an honorary doctorate (LL.D.) in 1994 by Liverpool University, and was knighted in 1997.

Personal life

Sir Miles has been married to Mary since 1966; they have one son and one daughter together and live in Colby, Isle of Man.

Government positions
Chairman of Tromode House Committee, 1977–80
Chairman of the Broadcasting Commission, 1979–81
Chairman of the Local Government Board, 1981–86
Chairman of the Income Tax Commission, 1985–86
Member of the Executive Council, 1981–90
Chief Minister, 1986–96

Walker's Councils of Ministers

Business Positions
Chairman of Hospice Isle of Man, 2010–present
Chairman of the Sefton Group plc., 2010–present

References

1940 births
Living people
Chief Ministers of the Isle of Man
Commanders of the Order of the British Empire
Knights Bachelor
Manx politicians
Manx businesspeople
Politicians awarded knighthoods